The discography of Japanese pop singer Alisa Mizuki consists of six studio albums, five compilation albums, twenty-seven singles, three video albums and twenty-eight music videos.

Albums

Studio albums

Compilation albums

Singles

Video albums

References 

Discographies of Japanese artists
Pop music discographies